Marie Susan "Sue" Walther (later Bilski, later Kuhlman; born December 8, 1944) is a retired American artistic gymnast. She won two gold and two bronze medals at the Pan American Games in 1963 and 1967. She competed at the 1964 Summer Olympics with the best individual result of 29th place in the floor exercise. Her sister Jackie was also a competitive gymnast.

References

1944 births
Living people
American female artistic gymnasts
Gymnasts at the 1964 Summer Olympics
Olympic gymnasts of the United States
Pan American Games medalists in gymnastics
Pan American Games gold medalists for the United States
Pan American Games bronze medalists for the United States
Gymnasts at the 1963 Pan American Games
Gymnasts at the 1967 Pan American Games
Medalists at the 1963 Pan American Games
Medalists at the 1967 Pan American Games
21st-century American women